D'Angelo Marshall (born 20 September 1990) is a Curaçaoan-Dutch kickboxer, currently signed with Glory.

He won 2013 SUPERKOMBAT World Grand Prix III, 2015 SUPERKOMBAT Special Edition and 2017 Glory Heavyweight Contender Tournament tournaments.

As of October 2020, he is ranked the #9 heavyweight in the world by Combat Press.

Kickboxing career

SUPERKOMBAT
In 2013, Marshall entered the SUPERKOMBAT World Grand Prix as a prospect of the Dutch school. He was the third heavyweight to qualify for SUPERKOMBAT World Grand Prix 2013 Final Elimination by winning over both Gaétan Sautron, and Giannis Stoforidis at the SUPERKOMBAT World Grand Prix III 2013.

He beat Pacôme Assi by second-round KO at the SUPERKOMBAT World Grand Prix 2013 Final Elimination in Ploiești, but lost to the eventual champion Frank Muñoz by unanimous decision in the semi-finals.

He defeated Thomas Vanneste at SUPERKOMBAT World Grand Prix III 2014 in Constanța, Romania on June 21, 2014. In March 2015, he beat Michał Wlazło by a first round TKO.

He participated in the 2015 SUPERKOMBAT Special Edition heavyweight tournament. He beat Michal Reissinger by decision in the semifinals, and won the tournament with a split decision win over Nikolaj Falin. 

His last fight with SUPERKOMBAT, was in May 2016, when he won a unanimous decision against Kirk Krouba.

GLORY
He was scheduled to face Guto Inocente in a co-headliner at Glory 37: Los Angeles Inocente won the fight by an extra round decision.

At Glory 41, he took part in the GLORY Heavyweight Contender tournament. He knocked out Mohamed Abdallah after just 48 seconds in the semifinals, and won a unanimous decision against Anderson Silva in the finals.

Afterwards, he fought Ismael Londt at Glory 49, and won by a first-round knockout. In the 2018 GLORY Contender tournament, he lost by knockout to Benjamin Adegbuyi in the semifinals.

Marshall won three of his next five fights, defeating Antonio Dvorak, Daniel Škvor and Jahfarr Wilnis, but losing to Jamal Ben Saddik and Benjamin Adegbuyi.

Titles

Professional
SUPERKOMBAT Fighting Championship 
2013 SUPERKOMBAT World Grand Prix III Tournament Champion
2015 SUPERKOMBAT Special Edition Tournament Champion

Glory 
2017 Glory Heavyweight (+95 kg/209.4 lb) Contender Tournament Winner

Professional kickboxing record

|-  bgcolor="#FFBBBB"
| 2019-11-22 || Loss||align=left| Benjamin Adegbuyi || Glory 71: Chicago || Chicago, USA || Decision (Unanimous) || 3 || 3:00
|-  style="background:#cfc;"
| 2019-07-05 || Win ||align=left| Jahfarr Wilnis || Glory 67: Orlando || Orlando, USA || Decision (Unanimous) || 3 || 3:00 
|- 
|-  style="background:#cfc;"
| 2019-03-09 || Win||align=left| Daniel Škvor || Glory 64: Strasbourg  || Strasbourg, France || KO (Punch) || 3 ||  1:43
|-  bgcolor= "FFBBBB" 
| 2018-09-29 || Loss ||align=left| Jamal Ben Saddik || Glory 59: Amsterdam || Amsterdam, Netherlands || TKO (3 Knockdowns Rules) || 1 || 0:57
|- 
|-  bgcolor="#CCFFCC"
| 2018-08-10 || Win ||align=left| Antonio Dvorak || Glory 56: Denver || Denver, Colorado || TKO (Straight right) || 1 || 2:14
|- 
|-  bgcolor= "FFBBBB" 
| 2018-02-16 || Loss ||align=left| Benjamin Adegbuyi || Glory 50: Chicago - Heavyweight Contender Tournament, Semi Finals || Chicago, US || KO (Punch) || 1 || 0:36
|- 
|-  bgcolor="#CCFFCC"
| 2017-12-09 || Win ||align=left| Ismael Londt || Glory 49: Rotterdam || Rotterdam, Netherlands || Decision (Unanimous) || 3 || 3:00
|- 
|-  bgcolor="#CCFFCC"
| 2017-05-20 || Win ||align=left| Anderson Silva|| Glory 41: Holland, Final || Den Bosch, Netherlands || Decision (Unanimous) || 3 || 3:00
|-
! style=background:white colspan=9 |
|-
|-  bgcolor="#CCFFCC"
| 2017-05-20 || Win ||align=left| Mohamed Abdallah || Glory 41: Holland, Semi Finals || Den Bosch, Netherlands || TKO (2 knockdowns) || 1 || 0:48
|- 
|-  bgcolor= "FFBBBB" 
| 2017-01-20 || Loss||align=left| Guto Inocente || Glory 37: Los Angeles || Los Angeles, California, US || Ext. R. Decision (Unanimous) || 4 || 3:00
|- 
|-  bgcolor="#CCFFCC"
| 2016-05-07 || Win ||align=left| Kirk Krouba || SUPERKOMBAT World Grand Prix II 2016 || Bucharest, Romania || Decision (Unanimous) || 3 || 3:00
|- 
|-  bgcolor="#CCFFCC"
| 2016-04-28 || Win ||align=left| Zakhar Trofimov || Tatneft Cup - 3rd selection 1/8 final || Kazan, Russia || TKO (Referee Stoppage) || 2 || 1:52
|- 
|-  bgcolor="#CCFFCC"
| 2015-06-13 || Win ||align=left| Nikolaj Falin || SUPERKOMBAT Special Edition, Finals || Spreitenbach, Switzerland || Decision (Split) || 3 || 3:00
|- 
! style=background:white colspan=9 |
|-
|-  bgcolor="#CCFFCC"
| 2015-06-13 || Win ||align=left| Michal Reissinger || SUPERKOMBAT Special Edition, Semi Finals || Spreitenbach, Switzerland || Decision || 3 || 3:00
|- 
|-  bgcolor="#CCFFCC"
| 2015-03-07 || Win ||align=left| Michał Wlazło || SUPERKOMBAT World Grand Prix I 2015 || Ploiești, Romania || TKO (Referee Stoppage) || 1 || 2:59
|-
|-  bgcolor= "#CCFFCC"
| 2014-06-21 || Win ||align=left| Thomas Vanneste || SUPERKOMBAT World Grand Prix III 2014 || Constanța, Romania || Decision (Unanimous) || 3 || 3:00 
|-  bgcolor="FFBBBB" 
| 2013-12-21 || Loss ||align=left| Frank Muñoz || SUPERKOMBAT World Grand Prix 2013 Final, Semi Finals || Galați, Romania || Decision (Unanimous) || 3 || 3:00
|-  bgcolor="#CCFFCC"
| 2013-11-09 ||Win ||align=left| Pacôme Assi  || SUPERKOMBAT World Grand Prix 2013 Final Elimination, Quarter Finals || Ploiești, Romania || KO (Punches) || 2 || 0:20
|-
|-  bgcolor="#CCFFCC"
| 2013-09-28 || Win ||align=left| Giannis Stoforidis || SUPERKOMBAT World Grand Prix III 2013, Final || Botoșani, Romania || TKO (Referee Stoppage) || 3 || 0:26
|-
! style=background:white colspan=9 |
|-
|-  bgcolor= "#CCFFCC"
| 2013-09-28 || Win ||align=left| Gaétan Sautron || SUPERKOMBAT World Grand Prix III 2013, Semi Finals || Botoșani, Romania || TKO (Referee Stoppage) || 4 || 2:53 
|-
|-  bgcolor= "#CCFFCC" 
| 2013-08-08 || Win ||align=left| Nedd Evan || Slamm!! Soema Na Basi IV  || Paramaribo, Suriname || Decision || 3 || 3:00 
|-
|-  bgcolor="#FFBBBB"
| 2013-06-29 || Loss ||align=left| Jegish Yegoian || Death Before Dishonor - Part III || Almere, Netherlands || Decision || 3 || 3:00
|-
|-  bgcolor="#CCFFCC"
| 2012-05-25 || Win ||align=left| Patrick Veenstra || Elsomo Muaythai Event || Marum, Netherlands || KO (Right Low Kick) || 2 ||  
|-
|-  bgcolor="#CCFFCC"
| 2013-02-24 || Win ||align=left| Essanoussi Bilal || Oosterbaan Gym Vs. De Rest - Part 2 || Rotterdam, Netherlands || Decision (Unanimous) || 3 || 3:00
|-
|-  bgcolor="#CCFFCC"
| 2012-10-29 || Win ||align=left| Jerry Otto || La Onda Fight Night || Magdeburg, Germany || KO (Right Knee) || 1 || 
|-
|-  bgcolor="#CCFFCC"
| 2012-09-01 || Win ||align=left| Sammy Saam || Mix Fight Gala XIII || Frankfurt, Germany || TKO || 1 || 
|-
|-  bgcolor="#CCFFCC"
| 2012-07-07 || Win ||align=left| Dragan || Fight Fans Last Fight Before Summer || Nieuwegein, Netherlands || KO (Right Low Kick) || 1 ||
|-  bgcolor="#FFBBBB"
| 2012-06-03 || Loss ||align=left| Martin Terpstra || Fight Fans || Amsterdam, Netherlands || Decision (Unanimous) || 3 || 3:00
|-  bgcolor="#c5d2ea"
| 2012-04-21 || Draw ||align=left| Patrick Veenstra || Elsomo Muaythai Event || Marum, Netherlands || Decision Draw || 3 || 3:00
|-
|-  bgcolor="#CCFFCC"
| 2011-10-29 || Win ||align=left| Michael Steffensen || Muaythai Event Of Garuda Gym || Emmen, Netherlands || KO (Right Knees) || 1 || 
|-
|-  bgcolor="#CCFFCC"
| 2011-10-09 || Win ||align=left| Jeanôt Adriaan || Death Before Dishonor - Part II || Almere, Netherlands || Decision (Unanimous) || 3 || 3:00
|-
|-  bgcolor="#CCFFCC"
| 2011-06-05 || Win ||align=left| Shota Dolidze || MM - Memento Mori 2 || Rotterdam, Netherlands || Decision (Unanimous) || 3 || 3:00  
|-
|-  bgcolor="#CCFFCC"
| 2011-04-10 || Win ||align=left| Ilnitsj Vrede || Almere's Finest I || Almere, Netherlands || KO || 2 ||
|-
|-  bgcolor="#CCFFCC"
| 2010-11-28 || Win ||align=left| Antonio Alecci || Muaythai Event || Enschede, Netherlands || KO (Right High Kick) || 1 ||
|-
|-
| colspan=9 | Legend:

See also 
List of male kickboxers

References

Living people
1990 births
Sportspeople from Amsterdam
Curaçao male kickboxers
Curaçao Muay Thai practitioners
Dutch male kickboxers
Dutch Muay Thai practitioners
Heavyweight kickboxers
Dutch people of Curaçao descent
Glory kickboxers
SUPERKOMBAT kickboxers